Pariahuanca (from Quechua Parya Wank'a) is one of twenty-eight districts of the Huancayo Province in Peru.

Geography 
The Waytapallana mountain range traverses the district. Other mountains are listed below:

Ethnic groups 
The people in the district are mainly indigenous citizens of Quechua descent. Quechua is the language which the majority of the population (58.38%) learnt to speak in childhood, 41.21% of the residents started speaking using the Spanish language (2007 Peru Census).

References